Dynamic height is a way of specifying the vertical position of a point above a vertical datum; it is an alternative for orthometric height or normal height.  
It can be computed dividing the location's geopotential number by the normal gravity at 45 degree latitude (a constant).

Dynamic height is constant if one follows the same gravity potential as one moves from place to place.  Because of variations in gravity, surfaces having a constant difference in dynamic height may be closer or further apart in various places.  Dynamic heights are usually chosen so that zero corresponds to the geoid.  

Dynamic height is the most appropriate height measure when working with the level of water over a large geographic area; it is used by the Great Lakes Datum in the US and Canada. 

When differential leveling is done, the path corresponds closely to following a value of dynamic height horizontally, but not to orthometric height for vertical changes measured on the leveling rod.  Thus small corrections must be applied to field measurements to obtain either the dynamic height or the orthometric height usually used in engineering.  US  National Geodetic Survey data sheets  give both dynamic and orthometric values.

See also
Geopotential height

References

Geodesy
Vertical position